Cosmopolitodus planus, also known as the hooked-tooth mako shark or hooked mako shark, is an extinct lamnid that lived during the Miocene epoch from 23 to 5 million years ago. C. planus can be found only in marine deposits on the Pacific Rim, especially the west coast of the United States. Teeth belonging to C. planus can reach lengths of 2.0 in (5.0 cm), and are often found in the Temblor Formation of Bakersfield, California.

Description
Cosmopolitodus planus exists only around the Pacific Rim areas, including Australia, Japan, the eastern coast of Russia, Oregon, California, and Mexico, while being most common in Southern California, especially at Sharktooth Hill near Bakersfield, California. With teeth up to two inches long, C. planus would probably be around the size of a modern great white shark and most likely preyed upon the fish, pinnipeds, and smaller cetaceans of its time.

Teeth
Cosmopolitodus planus teeth are somewhat similar to those of other mako sharks, especially the extinct species Cosmopolitodus hastalis and Isurus desori. Adult upper teeth are generally 2–4 cm long with an unserrated cutting edge and no lateral cusplets. True to its name, each tooth is "hooked", the point of which is shifted away from the middle axis, in the direction of the corners of the mouth. In this, the teeth of C. planus and I. desori differ from C. hastalis. I. desori teeth are much more heterodontic than C. planus and their roots are more uneven in thickness and shape, with more narrow builds and rounder lobes, somewhat making the appearance of a heart. But the crowns of the lower teeth of this species are described to be more straight and identical to the lower teeth of C. hastalis. The hooked teeth, which probably would be efficient for gripping prey, would suggest a diet of smaller and medium-sized animals.

Classification
The hooked-toothed mako was initially believed to be a true mako shark under the genus Isurus, hence its colloquial name "mako." However, the species is now believed to be descended from the narrow-form of the broad-tooth "mako" Cosmopolitodus hastalis, and its scientific name was thus reassigned to Cosmopolitodus planus in 2021. Although some paleontologists previously argued that Cosmopolitodus should be a synonym of Carcharodon due to  Cosmopolitodus being an ancestral species, Yun argued that the tooth fossil remains of Cosmopolitodus and great white shark "have been documented from the same deposits, hence the former cannot be a chronospecific ancestor of the latter."

References

Lamnidae
Miocene sharks